Verkhneantoshinsky is a rural locality (a khutor) in Verkhnebezymyanovskoye Rural Settlement, Uryupinsky District, Volgograd Oblast, Russia. The population was 44 as of 2010. There are 5 streets.

Geography 
Verkhneantoshinsky is located 39 km of Uryupinsk (the district's administrative centre) by road. Verkhnebezymyansky is the nearest rural locality.

References 

Rural localities in Uryupinsky District